Garry Thomas Sidebottom (21 November 1954 – 28 March 2019) was an Australian rules football player who played for the St Kilda, Geelong and Fitzroy Football Clubs in the Victorian Football League (VFL) and Swan Districts in the West Australian Football League (WAFL) during the 1970s and 1980s.

Career 
Sidebottom was a powerful and fearless player ideal for playing at centre half forward or as a ruckman. A versatile forward good in the air and hard in the clinches, he kicked 227 goals while at Swan Districts and 145 goals while in the VFL.

He played in the inaugural State of Origin team for Western Australia in 1977 when Western Australia defeated Victoria. In 1984 Sidebottom kicked six goals for Western Australia against Victoria in another famous victory to the Sandgropers. He represented Western Australia fifteen times in state games.

He joined St Kilda in 1978 and was their leading goal kicker in 1979. In 1980, Sidebottom, while playing for St Kilda in a match against Hawthorn at Moorabbin was dazed when he was hit across his right eye by a flying beer can. He required medical attention before he was able to continue in the match.  Despite captaining St Kilda in 1980, his contract was not renewed at the end of the season and he left the club to join Geelong in 1981.

Sidebottom entered football folklore when he missed the Geelong team bus to play in the 1981 Preliminary Final against Collingwood due to a breakdown in communications. His team-mate Peter Johnston took his place at the last minute, despite being told earlier he had not been selected, and went on to play despite having half a chicken and a bucket of chips along with a strawberry thickshake for lunch, and having smoked half a pack of Winfield Blue cigarettes on the way to VFL Park.

To this day, many Geelong locals call the place where the road from Lara enters the Princes Highway "Sidey's Corner". This is where Garry and the team bus were supposed to meet up, but never did.

In April 1982 he was suspended by Geelong due to an unsatisfactory attitude.

In 1985 he left Fitzroy to rejoin Swan Districts, where he was their leading goal kicker and won his second best and fairest award, nine years after his previous award, in 1976.

Sidebottom returned to Swan Districts as a coach of the reserves side in 2007.  He is the older brother of Allan Sidebottom who also played for Swan Districts, St Kilda and Fitzroy.

He was inducted into the West Australian Football Hall of Fame in 2011.

He died in March 2019 from cancer.

References

External links

1954 births
2019 deaths
Swan Districts Football Club players
St Kilda Football Club players
Geelong Football Club players
Fitzroy Football Club players
Western Australian State of Origin players
Australian rules footballers from Western Australia
West Australian Football Hall of Fame inductees